Julie Leth (born 13 July 1992) is a Danish racing cyclist, who currently rides for UCI Women's Continental Team . She competed in the 2013 UCI women's road race in Florence. Leth joined the  team in 2017. In December 2018,  announced that Leth would join them for the following season, after  folded.

Major results

2007 
1st  Individual Pursuit, National Junior Track Championships
3rd Individual Pursuit, National Track Championships

2008 
National Track Championships
1st  Scratch race
2nd Individual Pursuit
2nd Individual Sprint
1st Overall DCU-Cup
1st Carl Lorentzen Løbet
Jysk/Fynsk Mesterskab
1st Road Race
2nd Time Trial 
2nd Individual Pursuit, National Junior Track Championships
2nd Time Trial, National Junior Road Championships
3rd Randers Criterium

2009 
National Track Championships
1st  Scratch race
1st  Individual Sprint
2nd Individual Pursuit
1st  Individual Pursuit, National Junior Track Championships
1st Rund um Ascheffel
2nd Overall Youth Tour
2nd Overall Tour de Himmelfart
1st Stages 1 & 4
2nd Ballerup Super Arena Dame-Omnium
2nd Giro Nortorf
3rd Overall DCU's Dame Cup
3rd Time Trial, National Junior Road Championships

2010 
National Track Championships
1st  Points race
1st  Scratch race
1st  Individual Sprint
2nd Omnium
1st  Individual Pursuit, National Junior Track Championships
1st  Time Trial, National Junior Road Championships
1st Overall DCU-Cup
1st Stage 1
5th Road Race, National Road Championships
5th Overall Vittoria Cup
9th Scratch race, UCI World Track Championships

2011 
1st  Road Race, National Road Championships

2012 
National Road Championships
3rd Road Race
3rd Time Trial
8th Open de Suede Vargarda TTT

2013 
1st GP Ballerup
3rd Time Trial, National Road Championships

2014 
National Road Championships
1st  Time Trial
3rd Road Race

2015 
1st Madison, Melbourne Track Championships (with Annette Edmondson)

2017
National Track Championships
1st  Points race
2nd Individual Pursuit
3rd Scratch race

2018 
 1st  Madison, European Track Cycling Championships
1st  Omnium, National Track Championships
1st Madison, UCI Track Cycling World Cup – France (with Amalie Dideriksen)
7th Omloop van het Hageland

2019 
 1st  Madison, European Track Cycling Championships
1st  Omnium, National Track Championships
1st Cham-Hagendorn
1st Madison, UCI Track Cycling World Cup – Hong Kong (with Trine Schmidt)
3rd Madison, UCI Track Cycling World Championships

2020 
National Track Championships
1st  Omnium
1st  Individual Sprint
2nd Road Race, National Road Championships

2021
 2nd  Madison, Olympic Games (with Amalie Dideriksen)

2022
 10th Omloop Het Nieuwsblad

See also
 2012 Team Ibis Cycles season

References

External links
 

1992 births
Living people
Danish female cyclists
Danish track cyclists
Sportspeople from Aarhus
Olympic cyclists of Denmark
Cyclists at the 2020 Summer Olympics
Medalists at the 2020 Summer Olympics
Olympic medalists in cycling
Olympic silver medalists for Denmark
21st-century Danish women